WHYF (720 kHz) is a listener-supported AM radio station, licensed to Shiremanstown, Pennsylvania, and serving the Harrisburg metropolitan area.  It broadcasts a Catholic talk and teaching radio format, mostly from EWTN Radio with some local programs.  It is owned by Holy Family Radio, Inc. 

By day, WHYF is powered at 2,000 watts non-directional with a construction permit from the Federal Communications Commission (FCC) to increase power to 2,500 watts.  The station broadcasts only during daytime hours, to protect from interference WGN Chicago, the Class A, clear-channel station on 720 AM.

History
On , the station signed on the air.  It used the call sign WWII and had a Contemporary Christian music format. 

In July 2011, the station was sold to a group of Catholic broadcasters in the Diocese of Harrisburg, using the name Holy Family Radio, Inc.  The call letters switched to WHYF on August 2, 2011.

References

External links

HYF
Radio stations established in 1985
1985 establishments in Pennsylvania
HYF